COP9 signalosome complex subunit 7a is a protein that in humans is encoded by the COPS7A gene.

References

External links

Further reading